Milio's Sandwiches (formerly Big Mike's Super Subs) is an American restaurant chain that mainly sells submarine sandwiches.  The chain was founded in Madison, Wisconsin by Mike Liautaud in 1989.  The company has 35 locations throughout Wisconsin, Minnesota, and Iowa. The company headquarters are located in Middleton, Wisconsin.  Milio's was First Place in Madison Magazine's Best of Madison 2017 for Best Sandwich Spot and has been recognized for its community involvement.

Mike Liautaud is a cousin of Jimmy John's founder Jimmy John Liautaud and Erbert & Gerbert's founder Kevin Schippers, running competing sub shops. All three chains offer delivery of their sandwiches.

References

External links
Milio's Sandwiches website

Companies based in Madison, Wisconsin
Restaurants in Wisconsin
Economy of the Midwestern United States
Regional restaurant chains in the United States
Fast-food chains of the United States
Restaurants established in 1989
Fast-food franchises
Submarine sandwich restaurants
1989 establishments in Wisconsin